Jean-Loup Rivière (10 January 1948 – 23 November 2018) was a French playwright and drama critic.

Biography
Jean-Loup Rivière was born on 10 January 1948 in Caen, France.

He studied philosophy at the University of Caen, and led the Theatrical Research Group from 1969 to 1972. He wrote his doctoral thesis at École pratique des hautes études and began teaching at Paris West University Nanterre La Défense on 15 December 2001.

Rivière led the Atelier de création radiophonique on French culture from 1973 to 1983. He was also in charge of studies at Centre Georges Pompidou from 1977 to 1980, a drama critic at Libération from 1981 to 1982, a general secretary from 1983 to 1986, and a literary and artistic councillor at Comédie-Française from 1986 to 2001.

Rivière taught as a lecturer at the Institute of Theatre Studies for the University of Paris III: Sorbonne Nouvelle from 1995 to 2001. He was also a professor of theatre studies at the École normale supérieure de Lyon and a professor of dramaturgy at Conservatoire national supérieur d'art dramatique (CNSAD).

References

1948 births
2018 deaths
French dramatists and playwrights
Writers from Caen
University of Caen Normandy alumni
Academic staff of the University of Paris